Mastalus II (died 958) was the first duke of Amalfi from 957 until his death.

He succeeded his father as patricius in 953, when he was still a minor. He came of age in 957 and was elected dux, raising him to equal rank with the Dukes of Gaeta and Naples. In the next year, he was assassinated by Sergius of Musco Comite family on the Monte di Scala.

External links
Mastalo II (Mastalus Dux).

958 deaths
Mastalus
10th-century Italian nobility
10th-century rulers in Europe
Year of birth unknown
Assassinated nobility